Aventuras En El Tiempo is a soundtrack for the Mexican television series Aventuras En El Tiempo ("Adventures In Time"), it was released in Mexico by Fonovisa on July 31st, 2001.

Information 
The CD contains the music from the series performed for the cast, including Belinda, Christopher, Maribel Guardia, Ernesto D'alesio. The soundtrack was certified 2× Gold in Mexico.

Track listing

References 

Television soundtracks
2001 soundtrack albums